The 1993–94 Slovenian PrvaLiga season started on 22 August 1993 and ended on 12 June 1994. Each team played a total of 30 matches.

League table

Results

Top goalscorers

See also
1993–94 Slovenian Football Cup
1993–94 Slovenian Second League

References
General

External links
Official website of the PrvaLiga 

Slovenian PrvaLiga seasons
Slovenia
1993–94 in Slovenian football